Vrh nad Želimljami is a settlement above Želimlje in the Municipality of Škofljica in central Slovenia. The  municipality is part of the traditional region of Lower Carniola and is now included in the Central Slovenia Statistical Region.

Name
The name of the settlement was changed from Vrh to Vrh nad Želimljami in 1953.

Church

The local church is dedicated to Saint Peter and belongs to the Parish of Želimlje. It is a 15th-century Gothic building that was restyled in the Baroque. Fragments of mid-15th-century frescos are preserved on its interior walls.

References

External links

Vrh nad Želimljami on Geopedia

Populated places in the Municipality of Škofljica